An animal pound is a place where stray livestock were impounded. Animals were kept in a dedicated enclosure, until claimed by their owners, or sold to cover the costs of impounding.

Etymology
The terms "pinfold" and "pound" are Saxon in origin. Pundfald and pund both mean an enclosure. There appears to be no difference between a pinfold and a village pound.

The person in charge of the pinfold was the "pinder", giving rise to the surname Pinder.

Village pound or pinfold

The village pound was a feature of most English medieval villages, and they were also found in the English colonies of North America and in Ireland.

A high-walled and lockable structure served several purposes; the most common use was to hold stray sheep, pigs and cattle until they were claimed by the owners, usually for the payment of a fine or levy. Early pounds had just briar hedges, but most were built in stone or brick, making them more stock-proof.

The size and shape of village pounds varies. Some are four-sided—rectangular, square and irregular—while others are circular. Pounds are known to date from the medieval period. By the 16th century most villages and townships would have had a pound. Most of what remain today would date from the 16th and 17th centuries. Some are listed buildings, but most have fallen into disrepair.

Although commonest in England, there are also examples in other countries. "There was hardly a town in eighteenth-century New England without its town pound..."

The Sussex County Magazine in 1930 stated:

In some mountainous areas of northern Spain (such as Cantabria or Asturias) some similar enclosures are traditionally used to protect beehives from bear attacks.

Cultural references
The artist Andy Goldsworthy has produced a series of sculptures in several of the pinfolds in Cumbria.

See also
 Kraal
 Pen (enclosure)
 Scarisbrick, Lancashire, in which is the hamlet of Pinfold
 List of extant pinfolds in Cheshire
 Village lock-up
 Poundmaster

Notes

References

External links 

photos of examples of village pounds today on geograph
Google maps aerial view of a pinfold in Hougham, Lincolnshire

Agricultural buildings
Animal equipment
Animal welfare
Buildings and structures in England
Buildings and structures used to confine animals
Society in medieval England